Lawrence E. Briggs (June 23, 1903 - December 1970) was an American soccer coach who is best known for being the first men's soccer coach for the UMass Minutemen soccer program. Additionally, Briggs is known for being a founder of the National Soccer Coaches Association of America and served as their president in 1947. He was also a founding member of the now-defunct New England Intercollegiate Soccer League which served as a foundation for modern college soccer in the United States.

Briggs was enshrined in the National Soccer Hall of Fame in 1978.

References 

UMass Minutemen soccer coaches
Presidents of United Soccer Coaches
National Soccer Hall of Fame members
1970 deaths
American soccer coaches
1903 births